Ghosts is a 2014 Iranian drama film written and directed by Dariush Mehrjui.

Plot 
Commander Soleimani (Mehdi Soltani) and his wife get stuck in their relationship. The family lawyer's efforts to improve their living conditions are in vain. Years later, the commander's sins take over Maziar and make the path of his love and life difficult. Commander Soleimani rapes his maid (Melika Sharifinia) and makes her pregnant and...

Cast 
 Mahtab Keramati
 Homayoun Ershadi
 Mehdi Soltani
 Amirali Danaei
 Hengameh Hamidzadeh 
 Hassan Majuni
 Melika Sharifinia
 Rabeheh Madani
 Soroush Khoobroo
 Ahmad Yavarishad
 Hossein Dalman

References

External links

Ghosts at Namava

2014 films
2010s Persian-language films
Iranian drama films
2014 drama films
Films directed by Dariush Mehrjui